Sir William Robinson  (9 February 1836 – 1 December 1912) was a British colonial governor who was the last Governor of Trinidad and the first Governor of the merged colony of Trinidad and Tobago. He was also the 11th Governor of Hong Kong.

Early life and colonial services
Robinson was born in 1836 in Suffolk, England. He was the eldest son of the Rev. Isaac Banks Robinson and Jane Susan (née Syer). He entered the Colonial Office at age 18 as a clerk, and within several years served as private secretary to Herman Merivale,  Frederic Rogers and Edward Cardwell.

He became a Member of Slave Trade Commission in 1869 and was appointed Governor of Bahama Isles from 1874 to 1880. A year later, Robinson was appointed governor of the Windward Islands, a position he held until 1884. Afterwards, he became Governor of Barbados, and was transferred to become the Governor of Trinidad a year later. In 1889 the colony of Tobago was merged with Trinidad into the united colony of Trinidad and Tobago, with Robinson as its first governor, a position he held until 1891.

Governor of Hong Kong
In 1891, Robinson was appointed Governor of Hong Kong, a position he served until 1898 and later became his last post in the Colonial Services. During his tenure, Sun Yet-Sen graduated from the colony's Medical School. Also, Robinson received the thanks of the Hong Kong government for the settlement of the Fanny Josephine affair (Venezuela).

Personal life
Robinson married twice. He married his first wife, Julia Sophia Dampier, 17 July 1862 at St. Saviour's Church, Paddington. The couple had three sons. She died in 1881 and Robinson married Felicia Ida Helen Rattray three years later, 21 July 1884 in Nassau. She died ten years later and is buried in Hong Kong Cemetery. The couple had three daughters. Robinson himself died of heart disease on 1 December 1912 in London.

Honours
 CMG, 1877
 KCMG, 1883
 GCMG, 1897

Places named after him
Robinson Road, a major thoroughfare in Nassau, Bahamas, is named after Sir William Robinson, during whose term it was laid out.
Despite public perceptions to the contrary, there are no places in Hong Kong named after Sir William Robinson. Places in Hong Kong with the name Robinson were actually named for an earlier Governor, Hercules Robinson, later the 1st Baron Rosmead.
Robinson, Mark Aitchison Young and Christopher Patten are the only former Governors of Hong Kong who have nothing in Hong Kong named in their honour.

See also
 History of Hong Kong

References

|-

British governors of the Bahamas
Governors of Barbados
Governors of Hong Kong
Governors of British Trinidad
Governors of Trinidad and Tobago
1836 births
1912 deaths
Knights Grand Cross of the Order of St Michael and St George
People from the Grand Duchy of Baden
19th-century Hong Kong people
19th-century British politicians